Rear-Admiral Richard Tyrell (1691–26 June 1766) was an Irish officer in the Royal Navy.

Life

He was born in Dublin in 1691 the son of James and Mary Tyrell. Tyrell was a nephew of Sir Peter Warren, and entered the Royal Navy rather late in life, spending most of his active service in the West Indies.

His first post was as Lieutenant on the 44-gun HMS Launceston in January 1741 under Captain Peter Warren. In March 1742 he was given command of the 8-gun HMS Comet. He was promoted to Captain in December 1743 replacing Warren on HMS Launceston. In September 1744 he transferred to be Captain of the 20 gun HMS Deal Castle. Stationed in the West Indies he captured three French pivateers: La Bien Aime, La Fidele and La Providence.
In June 1745 he transferred to HMS Lyme. In April 1746 he captured the corvette La Saxonne off the Leeward Islands. In April 1747 he transferred to HMS Centaur remaining in the West Indies.

From September 1749 to February 1755 he took an extended leave, probably to attend his family.  He then took command of the 64 gun HMS Ipswich until March 1757. After another break in May 1757 he took command of the 74-gun HMS Buckingham and its crew of 472 men. On 3 November 1758 the Buckingham captured three French ships including the Florisant. In this action Tyrell was wounded several times and lost three fingers on his right hand.

In January 1759 he played an important role in the attack on Martinique as part of the Seven Years' War and a few days later captured Guadelope to much acclaim. In June 1759 he was given command of the huge HMS Foudroyant which had been captured from the Freench at the Battle of Cartagena. He was promoted to Rear Admiral of the White in October 1762.

He earned the title of commander-in-chief of the Leeward Islands Station in 1765.

Having resigned command of the Leeward Islands Station in 1766, he died of fever on 26 June 1766 on board HMS Princess Louisa, and was buried at sea. He has a large memorial in the south nave aisle of Westminster Abbey. The extraordinary monument originaaly featured a figure floating heavenward, detached from its background amid a group of very flat clouds (earning it the nickname "The Pancake Monument". Meanwhile HMS Buckingham lies trapped in the coral at the bottom of the sea. It was sculpted by Nicholas Read.

Family
He was married to Russell Tankard (sic) and had a daughter, Ann Barnes and son Richard.

References

External links

Royal Navy rear admirals
1716 births
1766 deaths
Irish sailors
People from Dublin (city)